Qiushi is the leading official theoretical journal and news magazine of the Chinese Communist Party (CCP), published bi-monthly by the Central Party School and the Central Committee. The journal is headquartered in Beijing.

The publication aims to publicize the CCP's governing philosophy. According to its English language version, "about 60%" of the articles published in the journal are written by state and CCP leaders such as the CCP general secretary Xi Jinping and senior officials at the ministerial and provincial levels. Contributors also include scholars and researchers of China's think tanks and academic institutions.

Reflecting the official positions of the CCP and its leaders, the journal aims to "educate and guide the whole party to consciously maintain a high degree of consistency with the CCP Central Committee in ideological and political actions." In doing so, it serves as an organizational framework for the CCP ideology and an instructive guide for upcoming cadres within it.

History
In light of China's changing political climate, the CCP sought to distance itself from the Cultural Revolution, favoring instead a policy of Reform and Opening. Qiushi's more Cultural Revolution-oriented, Maoist predecessor, Red Flag, was halted in June 1988. Quishi was first published in July 1988 as a more reform-oriented voice for the CCP. The title originates from the quote shí shì qiú shì (实事求是), which means "seeking truth from facts." The journal's logo was handwritten by former CCP leader, Deng Xiaoping.

Qiushi established its website on 1 July 2009. On 1 October 2009, an English-language edition of the journal was introduced. Qiushi Online, the journal's English language website, uses materials from both the Chinese and English versions of the journal to "introduce the CPC's theories, policies, and practical experience in national governance to a domestic and foreign audience."

In January 2015, Qiushi published an article by Xu Lan, an official from the publicity office of Ningbo, Zhejiang Province, criticizing university professors for "spreading Western values among Chinese youth."

On 15 February 2020, Qiushi documented Xi Jinping's January 7th order regarding the COVID-19 outbreak at a CCP Politburo Standing Committee. Later, on 11 October 2020, Qiushi published an article by Xi Jinping titled "Opening Up New Frontiers for Marxist Political Economy in Contemporary China," in which he quotes French economist Thomas Picketty's work as justification for China's current socialist system in regards to income inequality and wealth inequality.

Academic study
The magazine is of particular interest to sinologists and China scholars since it is a useful collection of speeches and articles by top CCP leaders, giving a useful indication of the general policy direction of the CCP and to some extent general attitudes within the party on certain issues of national and international importance.

See also

People's Daily
Kulloja

References

External links
 
Official website, English edition (translation of selected articles)

1988 establishments in China
Bi-monthly magazines published in China
Chinese-language magazines
Communist magazines
Central Committee of the Chinese Communist Party
Magazines established in 1988
Magazines published in Beijing
Political magazines published in China
State media